Mojito isleño, or mojo isleño, is a Puerto Rican condiment.

Preparation
The sauce is made with water, vinegar, olive oil, olives, capers, tomato, onion, garlic, bay leaves, culantro, and chili peppers. It's simmered for a few minutes 
or hours. In some regions basil, wine, coconut milk and a small amount of mashed pigeon peas or kidney beans are added to thicken the sauce. It is used as a topping for fish and shellfish.

Origin 
The dish originated in Salinas, Puerto Rico also known as "La Cuna del Mojito Isleño" (the cradle of the islander dip).

See also

 Pasta Puttanesca, an Italian pasta dish with similar ingredients in its sauce

References 

Chili pepper dishes
Puerto Rican cuisine